Milton Turner may refer to:

 Milt Turner (1930-1993), American jazz drummer
 James Milton Turner (1840-1915), American political leader and diplomat